Kirk Daniel Cousins (born August 19, 1988) is an American football quarterback for the Minnesota Vikings of the National Football League (NFL). He played college football at Michigan State and was drafted by the Washington Redskins in the fourth round of the 2012 NFL Draft as a backup to fellow rookie Robert Griffin III. Cousins occasionally appeared in games during his first three seasons before replacing Griffin following an injury in 2015, where he remained the team's starter until 2017. With the Redskins, Cousins set numerous franchise records and was named to the 2017 Pro Bowl.

After two years of signing franchise tags and being unable to agree with the team on a long-term deal, Cousins signed a fully guaranteed three-year 84 million contract with the Vikings as a free agent in 2018. He ranks sixth all-time in completion percentage with at least 1,500 pass attempts, and is eighth in the NFL's all-time regular season career passer rating.

Early life
Kirk Cousins was born to Don Cousins and Maryann Cousins, the second oldest of their three children. Born in Barrington, Illinois on August 19, 1988, Cousins attended Holland Christian High School in Holland, Michigan, where he starred in football, baseball (as a third baseman and a pitcher), and basketball for the Maroons athletic teams. He broke his ankle in his junior year and was forced to attend camps in order to make an impression with recruiting colleges. Cousins finished his high school football career with 3,204 passing yards, 40 touchdowns, and 18 interceptions.

After high school, Cousins was set to sign with Toledo or Western Michigan, until Mark Dantonio became the head coach at Michigan State in 2007. After Dantonio failed to sign his top targets at quarterback, he offered a scholarship to Cousins, which he accepted. He also participated in the Athletes in Action sports ministry.

College career
Cousins redshirted for the 2007 season. In 2008, he spent the season as the backup quarterback to Brian Hoyer. He played in five games passing for a total of 310 yards and two touchdowns and one interception. In 2009, he competed for and won the starting quarterback job against teammate Keith Nichol. He led Michigan State to a 6–7 (4–4) season with 19 touchdowns, nine interceptions and 2,680 passing yards in 12 games. In 2010, he led Michigan State to an 11–2 (7–1) record and a share of the Big Ten Championship.

In 2011, the Spartans went 11–3 (7–2) and played in the first-ever Big Ten championship game. Cousins was named Second-team All-Big Ten by the coaches, and played his final game as a Michigan State Spartan on January 2, 2012, defeating the Georgia Bulldogs in the Outback Bowl.  His teams posted an undefeated 4–0 record against the in-state rival Michigan Wolverines. Cousins won the 2011 Lowes's Senior CLASS Award. Cousins majored in kinesiology.

College statistics

Professional career

Washington Redskins
Cousins was selected by the Washington Redskins as the seventh choice in the fourth round of the 2012 NFL Draft, making him the 102nd draft pick overall. The pick surprised many analysts, as the Redskins had drafted 2011 Heisman Trophy winner Robert Griffin III with the second overall pick to be their franchise quarterback. The Redskins acquired the Griffin III pick by giving the St. Louis Rams four high-value draft picks over three years. Cousins was viewed as an insurance policy in case Griffin was injured, with Redskins head coach Mike Shanahan saying "You're one or two plays away from being the starter...And if I see that value out there on the third day of the draft, I'm going to take that." The Redskins drafting Griffin and Cousins in the same draft echoed the team's strategy in the 1994 NFL draft, when the team drafted Heath Shuler with the third overall pick and later drafted Gus Frerotte in the seventh round.

2012: Rookie year

On May 31, 2012, Cousins signed a four-year contract with the Redskins.

In the second game of the preseason against the Chicago Bears, Cousins threw three touchdowns in the fourth quarter, though the Redskins would go on to lose 33–31. In the fourth and final game of preseason, against the Tampa Bay Buccaneers, Cousins completed 15 of 27 passes for 222 yards as the Redskins won 30–3. He was named the backup quarterback over incumbent starter Rex Grossman.

Cousins made his NFL debut in the third quarter of a Week 5 loss to the Atlanta Falcons after Griffin suffered a concussion. Cousins threw his first NFL touchdown pass on a 77-yard pass to Santana Moss but threw two interceptions in the last two series of the game while trying to tie the game.

Cousins' second NFL appearance came in Week 14 against the Baltimore Ravens. On the final drive of the game, with the Redskins down 8, Griffin suffered a knee injury. Cousins went 2–2 and finished the drive with an 11-yard touchdown pass to Pierre Garçon with 29 seconds remaining, to bring the Redskins within 2 points of the Ravens. On the two-point conversion, Shanahan called for a run-pass option, and Cousins scored on a quarterback draw to tie the game at 28. The Redskins would win in overtime 31–28.

The following week, on December 15, 2012, Cousins was announced as the Redskins starter for the Week 15 game against the Cleveland Browns, marking his first NFL start. After a slow first half, Cousins rallied the offense to a 28-point second half. Cousins finished the day 26-of-37 for 329 yards with 2 touchdown passes, bringing the Redskins a 38–21 win. Later that week, Cousins was voted the Pepsi NFL Rookie of the Week, becoming the third Redskins rookie to receive the honor that season (after Griffin and Alfred Morris).

Cousins finished his rookie year with 466 passing yards, four touchdowns, and three interceptions in three games and one start.

The Redskins finished atop the NFC East with a 10–6 record. In the Wild Card Round, they faced the Seattle Seahawks. In the 24–14 loss, Cousins came into the game late in the fourth quarter in relief of an injured Griffin. He finished the game 3-of-10 for 31 yards and was unable to rally the team to victory.

2013: Backup year

On December 11, 2013, Cousins was named starting quarterback for the rest of the year after Shanahan deactivated Robert Griffin III for the remainder of the season in order to protect him for the following year, with Rex Grossman as Cousins's backup. In Week 15, in a narrow 27–26 loss to the Atlanta Falcons, he finished 29-of-45 for 381 yards, three touchdowns, and two interceptions.

Cousins finished his second professional season with 854 passing yards, four touchdowns, and seven interceptions in five games and three starts.

2014: Backup year

On February 2, 2014, it was reported that Cousins had stated that he was open to a trade from the Redskins.

In March, Cousins announced that he would be giving the #12 jersey to incoming new wide receiver Andre Roberts for the price of a $12,000 donation to the Kirk Cousins Football Camp. Cousins then switched over to the #8 jersey, a number he wore throughout his high school and college career.

During Week 2 against the Jacksonville Jaguars, Cousins came in relief of Griffin who left the game with a dislocated ankle. Cousins finished the game with 250 passing yards and two touchdowns in a 41–10 victory. In the next game against the Philadelphia Eagles, Cousins threw for 427 yards, the first game he had over 400 passing yards. Washington still lost an ensuing slugfest to the Eagles 34–37. The following week against the New York Giants, Cousins had a poor showing, throwing for a touchdown with four interceptions and a lost fumble. The Redskins were blown out 45–14 with a total of 6 turnovers.

In Week 5, against the defending Super Bowl champion Seattle Seahawks, Cousins showed progress from the embarrassing loss to the Giants by throwing for two touchdowns without an interception, including a 68-yard touchdown pass to DeSean Jackson. Despite the solid performance from Cousins, the Redskins lost by a score of 27–17. Following a poor performance in the first half in the Week 7 game against the Tennessee Titans, he was benched at halftime in favor of backup quarterback Colt McCoy, and did not play in any more games for the remainder of the season.

2015: Transition to starter

On August 31, 2015, Cousins was named the starter for the season over Robert Griffin III. On October 4, Cousins led a 90-yard game-winning drive against the Philadelphia Eagles, his first since 2012, when he threw a touchdown pass to Pierre Garçon with under a minute left in the fourth quarter, winning the game 23–20.

On October 25, Cousins helped lead the Redskins to their largest comeback win in franchise history. After being down 24–0 in the second quarter against the Tampa Bay Buccaneers at home, Cousins finished with 317 yards and four total touchdowns, three passing and one rushing, throwing the final touchdown pass to Jordan Reed in the final seconds of the game. Cousins also tied a franchise record for completions in a game with 33, tying Jason Campbell who did the same in 2007. When heading into the locker room after the game, Cousins was caught on camera shouting "you like that?!" to reporters, which later become a catchphrase used by Cousins, his teammates, and Redskins fans throughout the rest of the season. Cousins and his brother Kyle applied to trademark the catchphrase later in the season and began to sell T-shirts with the phrase to raise money for the International Justice Mission charitable organization.

Against the New Orleans Saints on November 15, Cousins threw for a career-high four touchdowns, as well as posting a perfect passer rating of 158.3, making him the first Redskins quarterback since 1950 to do that with at least 20 attempts. Against the Buffalo Bills on December 20, Cousins passed for four touchdowns, and ran for another in a Redskins victory, marking his second four-touchdown passing game of the season.

The following week against the Philadelphia Eagles, Cousins took an ill-advised quarterback kneel inside the Eagles' redzone with six seconds left before halftime, running out the clock and forgoing any chance of adding upon Washington's lead. Despite that, Cousins eventually passed for four touchdowns in the game, his second consecutive four-touchdown performance and third overall on the season. The performance led to the Redskins’ victory over the Eagles with a score of 38–24, which allowed the team to win the NFC East division title for the first time since Griffin III did it in 2012.

Cousins finished the 2015 season posting the highest completion percentage (74.7) in home games in NFL history, with a minimum of 100 attempts, leading the Redskins to a 6–2 record at home. He also became the first Redskins quarterback since Sonny Jurgensen in 1970 to have at least four passing touchdowns in three or more games in one season. Against the Dallas Cowboys on January 3, 2016, he set the Redskins single-season passing yardage record with 4,166, passing Jay Schroeder who had 4,109 in 1986. He also finished the season with 29 passing touchdowns, second in Redskins history behind Jurgensen who had 31 in 1967, while posting a league-leading completion percentage of 69.8%, second in team history behind Sammy Baugh who completed 70.3% of his passes in 1945.

Against the Green Bay Packers in the Wild Card Round on January 10, 2016, Cousins completed 29-of-46 passes for 329 yards and scored two touchdowns (one passing, one rushing), but was sacked six times and lost one fumble. The Redskins lost 35–18, ending their season. He was ranked 85th by his fellow players on the NFL Top 100 Players of 2016.

2016: First Pro Bowl selection

Cousins was set to become an unrestricted free agent in the 2016 offseason, but the Redskins used the non-exclusive franchise tag on him on March 1, 2016. The tag acted as a one-year, $20 million contract, which prevented other teams in the league from signing him without giving up two first round draft picks to the Redskins.

During the Week 8 International Series game against the Cincinnati Bengals at Wembley Stadium in London, Cousins threw for a career-high 458 passing yards, as the game ended in a 27–27 tie. As the game ended in a tie, it also marked the first time a game held in London went into overtime. Three weeks later against the Green Bay Packers, Cousins threw for 375 yards along with three touchdowns in a 42-24 victory, earning him his third NFC Offensive Player of the Week award. After the game, Cousins was caught on camera asking Redskins general manager Scot McCloughan "How you like me now?" which many in the media believed Cousins was addressing concerns about his potentially lucrative long-term contract with the team next season. In a Thanksgiving Day 31-26 road loss against the Dallas Cowboys, Cousins completed 41 of 53 passes for 449 yards with three touchdowns and no interceptions, putting him second on the list of most passing yards in a Thanksgiving Day game in NFL history. For his accomplishments in the month of November, Cousins won the NFC Offensive Player Of The Month award, his second time winning the award. In Week 16, on Christmas Eve, against the Chicago Bears, Cousins had a career-high two rushing touchdowns in the 41–21 road victory.

Despite missing the playoffs, Cousins led the team to a winning record of 8–7–1 and finished the season with a career-high 4,917 passing yards, which was third in the NFL behind Drew Brees and Matt Ryan, breaking various personal and team records he had set the previous year. Cousins' 67% completion percentage ranked No. 7 and his 45.7% deep-ball completion percentage ranked No. 5 among NFL quarterbacks in 2016.

Due to his performance in the season, Cousins was named to his first Pro Bowl, replacing Atlanta Falcons quarterback Matt Ryan, who could not take part in the game due to the Falcons' appearance in Super Bowl LI. During the game, Cousins played throughout most of the second half, and notably forced a fumble on Denver Broncos cornerback Aqib Talib after chasing him down the field after throwing an interception late in the fourth quarter. Cousins was also ranked 70th by his peers on the NFL Top 100 Players of 2017.

2017: Final year in Washington

Again set to become an unrestricted free agent in the offseason, Cousins and the Redskins attempted to work out a long-term deal before the start of free agency, but could only come to an agreement on the exclusive franchise tag on February 28, 2017, becoming the first quarterback in NFL history to be franchise-tagged in consecutive years.

During a Week 3 27-10 victory over the Oakland Raiders on NBC Sunday Night Football, Cousins went 25-for-30 for a season-high 365 yards and three touchdowns, earning him his fourth NFC Offensive Player of the Week award of his career. During Week 10 against the Minnesota Vikings, Cousins tied his single-game career-high with two rushing touchdowns in the 38–30 loss. The Redskins finished the 2017 season with a 7–9 record and missed the playoffs.

Cousins finished the season 347-of-540 for 4,093 yards, 27 touchdowns, and 13 interceptions. The 2017 season marked his third consecutive season of passing for at least 4,000 yards. In addition to his passing totals, he rushed 49 times for 179 yards and four rushing touchdowns. Cousins was ranked 94th by his peers on the NFL Top 100 Players of 2018.

Minnesota Vikings
On March 15, 2018, Cousins signed with the Minnesota Vikings on a fully guaranteed three-year contract worth $84 million. This was the first fully guaranteed and, as of signing, highest paying contract in NFL history.

2018

In his Vikings debut in the season opener against the San Francisco 49ers, Cousins passed for 244 yards and two touchdowns in the 24–16 victory. In the next game against the Green Bay Packers, he finished with 425 passing yards, four touchdowns, and an interception as the game ended in a 29–29 tie. Two weeks later against the Los Angeles Rams on Thursday Night Football, Cousins threw for 422 yards and three touchdowns in the 38-31 road loss. Despite Cousins's strong statistical start to the season, inconsistency within the offense and coaching staff ended up impacting the Vikings' season. With the Vikings at 6–5–1 going into Week 14 against the Seattle Seahawks, the Vikings were still in the playoff hunt, but a 21–7 road loss on Monday Night Football resulted in the firing of offensive coordinator John DeFilippo. The Vikings won their next two games, against the Miami Dolphins and Detroit Lions, with Cousins passing for five touchdowns and an interception combined. In the regular-season finale against the Chicago Bears, the Vikings would have made the playoffs with a win, but they fell 24–10, with Cousins passing for 132 yards and a touchdown.

Cousins finished his first season with the Vikings with 4,298 passing yards, 30 touchdowns, and 10 interceptions to go along with 123 rushing yards and a touchdown.

2019: First playoff win

During the season-opener against the Atlanta Falcons, Cousins completed 8 of 10 passes for 98 yards and a touchdown in the 28–12 win. In the next game against the Green Bay Packers, he completed 14 passes for 230 yards with a touchdown and two interceptions in the 21–16 road loss. The following week against the Oakland Raiders, Cousins completed 15 passes for 174 yards, including a 35-yard touchdown pass, in the 34–14 win. In Week 4, against the Chicago Bears, he had two fumbles and no passing touchdowns but still passed 27 times for 233 yards in the 16–6 road loss. In the next game, against the New York Giants, Cousins completed 22 passes for 306 yards and two touchdowns in the 28–10 road victory. The following week against the Philadelphia Eagles, he threw for 333 yards, four touchdowns, and an interception in the 38–20 win. During Week 7 against the Detroit Lions, Cousins passed for 337 yards and four touchdowns in the 42–30 road victory.

During Week 11 against the Denver Broncos, Cousins threw for 319 yards and three touchdowns as the Vikings overcame a 20-point first half deficit and won 27–23. Two weeks later against the Seattle Seahawks on Monday Night Football, he threw for 276 yards, two touchdowns, and an interception in the 37–30 road loss, extending Cousins' record on Mondays to an 0–8 record. During Week 16 against the Packers once again on Monday Night Football, Cousins threw for 122 yards, a touchdown, and an interception in the 23–10 loss. The Packers clinched the NFC North division title with the win. It also extended Cousins' record on Monday Night Football to 0–9. With the Vikings' playoff position set, Cousins did not play in the regular-season finale against the Chicago Bears. He finished the 2019 season with 3,603 passing yards, 26 passing touchdowns, and six interceptions to go along with 63 rushing yards and a touchdown. Cousins was also named to his second career Pro Bowl.

In the NFC Wild Card game against the New Orleans Saints, Cousins threw for 242 yards and the game winning touchdown to tight end Kyle Rudolph in overtime during the 26–20 road victory. In the Divisional Round against the San Francisco 49ers, Cousins threw for 172 yards, a touchdown, and an interception in the 27–10 road loss.

2020

On March 18, 2020, Cousins signed a two-year, $66 million contract extension with the Vikings.

During Week 2 against the Indianapolis Colts, Cousins threw for 113 yards and three interceptions during the 28–11 road loss. He finished the game with a total quarterback rating of 15.9, the third-lowest mark in Vikings franchise history. In Week 3 against the Tennessee Titans, Cousins had a much better outing, throwing for 251 yards, three touchdowns, and two interceptions during the narrow 31–30 loss. The following week against the Houston Texans, Cousins threw for 260 yards and a touchdown during the 31–23 road victory, the Vikings' first win of the season. Two weeks later against the Atlanta Falcons, Cousins threw for 343 yards, three touchdowns, and three interceptions during the 40–23 loss. He threw all three interceptions in the first half of the game. Three weeks later against the Detroit Lions, he threw for 220 yards and three touchdowns on only 13 completions during the 34–20 win.

In Week 10 against the Chicago Bears on Monday Night Football, Cousins threw for 292 yards, two touchdowns, and an interception in the 19–13 road victory. This was Cousins' first ever Monday Night Football win after previously going 0–9 in his career. During Week 11 against the Dallas Cowboys, Cousins threw for 318 yards and three touchdowns during the 31–28 loss. In the next game against the Carolina Panthers, he threw for 307 yards and three touchdowns in the narrow 28–27 comeback victory. This was Cousins' fourth straight game with a passer rating over 100. He was named the NFC Offensive Player of the Week for his performance. The following week against the Jacksonville Jaguars, Cousins threw for 305 yards, three touchdowns, and an interception in the 27–24 overtime victory. Three weeks later against the New Orleans Saints on Christmas Day, he threw for 291 yards and three touchdowns during the 33–52 road loss, eliminating the Vikings from postseason contention. In the regular-season finale against the Lions, Cousins threw for 405 yards and three touchdowns and rushed for another during the 37–35 road victory. He was named the NFC Offensive Player of the Week for his performance.

Cousins finished the season with 4,265 passing yards, 35 touchdowns, and 13 interceptions to go along with 156 rushing yards and a touchdown.

2021: Third Pro Bowl selection

Cousins started the 2021 season with 351 passing yards and two touchdowns in a 27–24 overtime road loss to the Cincinnati Bengals. In Week 11 against the Green Bay Packers, Cousins threw 24 completions of 35 attempts with 341 passing yards and three passing touchdowns in a 34-31 victory. In Week 13 against the Detroit Lions, Cousins went for 30-of-40 passes for 340 yards with two touchdowns in a 27-29 defeat.

Cousins drew controversy over his decision not to receive the COVID-19 vaccination, although he agreed to follow NFL protocols. In response to his comments, which drew from a personal decision, Holland Hospital, with whom Cousins had served as spokesperson, announced they were discontinuing Cousins' role indefinitely. Prior to Week 17, Cousins was placed on the COVID-19 reserve list and ruled out for the game against the Green Bay Packers. Which they lost 37-10 eliminating them from playoff contention. 

Cousins finished the season with 4,221 passing yards, 33 touchdowns, and seven interceptions to go along with 115 rushing yards and a touchdown. He was nominated to his third Pro Bowl of his career.

2022: NFC North Title, Fourth Pro Bowl selection

On March 13, 2022, Cousins signed a one-year, $35 million fully guaranteed contract extension through the 2023 season. In the season opener against the Green Bay Packers, Cousins threw 23-of-32 passes for 277 yards with two touchdowns, and a 118.9 passer rating in 23-7 victory. In the following week against the Philadelphia Eagles on Monday Night Football, Cousins passed 27 completions of 46 attempts for 221 yards with one touchdown and three interceptions in a 7-24 blowout loss. In Week 6 against the Miami Dolphins, Cousins threw for 175 yards and two touchdowns in a 24-16 win.

In the following bye week, Cousins completed 24 of 36 passes for 232 passing yards and two touchdowns in 34-26 victory against the Arizona Cardinals. In Week 10 against the Buffalo Bills, Cousins completed 30-of-50 passes for a season-high 357 passing yards with one passing touchdown and two interceptions in 33-30 overtime win. In Week 14, against the Detroit Lions, Cousins passed for 425 yards and two touchdowns in the 34–23 loss.

In a week 15 game against the Indianapolis Colts, Cousins completed 34 of 54 passes for a career-high 460 passing yards, four touchdowns, and two interceptions with a 99.3 passer rating in the 39-36 overtime win, highlighted by the Vikings completing the largest comeback in NFL history. With the win, the Vikings also clinched the NFC North for the first time since 2017. For this, Cousins was named NFC Offensive Player of the Week for Week 15. The next week, on a Christmas Eve matchup against the New York Giants at home, Cousins completed 34 passes for 299 yards and 3 touchdowns in a 27-24 win, in which he orchestrated a last-minute drive that culminated in kicker Greg Joseph making the longest field goal in Vikings' history, a 61-yard attempt, to defeat the Giants.

For the 2022 season, Cousins started all 17 of the teams' games, leading them to a 13-4 record, alongside a NFC North title. Seeded 3rd, the Vikings faced off against the 6th seeded Giants in the Wild Card round, on January 15, 2023. Playing at home, Cousins had a solid individual game, completing 31-of-39 passes for 273 yards, 2 touchdowns and no interceptions, alongside a rushing touchdown. His two passing touchdowns were to K. J. Osborn and Irv Smith Jr. Despite his efforts, the Vikings defense were stymied by a Giants offence led by Daniel Jones, who passed for over 300 yards and 2 touchdowns, with an additional 78 rushing yards, defeating the Vikings 31-24.

NFL career statistics

Regular season

Postseason

Career records

NFL records
 Most game-winning drives in a single season: 8 (tied with Matthew Stafford)
 Most fourth-quarter comebacks in a single season: 8 (tied with Matthew Stafford)
 Largest comeback (33 point deficit)

Minnesota Vikings franchise records
 Most pass completions in a regular season: 425
 Most consecutive games with a passing touchdown: 39
 Most consecutive pass attempts without an interception: 224
 Most consecutive seasons with at least 3,600 passing yards
 Most consecutive pass completions to start a game: 17

Washington Commanders franchise records

 Most 300-yard passing games in a season: 6
 Most 300-yard passing games in career: 24
 Most pass completions in a regular season: 406
 Most consecutive passes without an interception at home: 232
 Most 400-yard passing games in career: 3
 Most 4,000-yard passing seasons: 3
 Most consecutive 4,000-yard passing seasons: 3
 Most passing yards in a season: 4,917

Personal life
Cousins is a practicing Evangelical Christian. He married Julie Hampton on June 28, 2014, in Atlanta, Georgia. As of 2019, Cousins and his wife have two sons, Cooper and Turner. During his time with the Redskins, Cousins earned the nicknames "Captain Kirk" from the media for his presence as a leader, referencing the Star Trek character. He also appeared in several commercials with Easterns Automotive, a D.C. used car dealership, with former Washington teammates Josh Norman and Ryan Kerrigan.

Cousins has been one of the NFL's most prominent players concerning his choice to not be vaccinated against COVID-19, which resulted in him being listed in the NFL's Reserve/COVID-19 list twice during the 2021 NFL season. As a result, Cousins missed four training camp practices in the 2021 preseason. Following his comments, the Holland Hospital in West Michigan ended its relationship with him. However, despite his stance, Cousins stated that he would do everything to ensure that he doesn't test positive for COVID-19, including the use of a plexiglass in the team facility. In Week 17, Cousins self-reported symptoms and later tested positive, ruling him out of playing that weekend against the Packers.

Cousins is a cousin of current Milwaukee Brewers pitcher Jake Cousins. He has also supported Compassion International and its “Fill the Stadium” initiative.

Cousins was recorded on-and-off the field during the 2022 NFL season for a Netflix and NFL Films documentary series, Quarterback, which will debut in the middle of 2023.

Notes

References

External links

 
 
 Minnesota Vikings bio
 Michigan State Spartans bio

1988 births
Living people
21st-century evangelicals
American evangelicals
American football quarterbacks
Michigan State Spartans football players
Minnesota Vikings players
National Conference Pro Bowl players
People from Barrington, Illinois
People from Holland, Michigan
Players of American football from Illinois
Players of American football from Michigan
Sportspeople from Cook County, Illinois
Sportspeople from Lake County, Illinois
Washington Redskins players